St. Paul's Episcopal Church or variants may refer to:
 St. Paul's Episcopal Church (Magnolia Springs, Alabama)
Saint Paul's Episcopal Chapel (Mobile, Alabama), NRHP-listed
 St. Paul's Episcopal Church (Selma, Alabama)
 St. Paul's Episcopal Church (Tombstone, Arizona), listed on the National Register of Historic Places (NRHP)
 St. Paul's Episcopal Church (Yuma, Arizona), NRHP-listed
 St. Paul's Episcopal Church (Walnut Creek, California)
 St. Paul's Episcopal Church (Georgetown, Delaware)
 St. Paul's Episcopal Church, Rock Creek Parish (Washington, D.C.)
 St. Paul's Episcopal Church (Augusta, Georgia)
 St. Paul's Episcopal Church (Blackfoot, Idaho), NRHP-listed
 St. Paul's Episcopal Church (Peoria, Illinois)
 St. Paul's Episcopal Church (Evansville, Indiana)
 St. Paul's Episcopal Church (Durant, Iowa)
 St. Paul's Episcopal Church (Harlan, Iowa)
 St. Paul's Episcopal Church (Henderson, Kentucky) (1859-60)
 St. Paul's Episcopal Church (Newport, Kentucky)
 St. Paul's Episcopal Church (Brunswick, Maine)
 St. Paul's Episcopal Church (Baltimore, Maryland)
 St. Paul's Episcopal Church (Hillsboro, Maryland)
 St. Paul's Episcopal Church (Point of Rocks, Maryland)
 St. Paul's Episcopal Church (Ironton, Missouri), NRHP-listed
 Saint Paul's Episcopal Church (Lee's Summit, Missouri)
 St. Paul's Episcopal Church (Fort Benton, Montana), a National Register of Historic Places listing in Chouteau County, Montana
 St. Paul's Episcopal Church (Virginia City, Nevada)
 St. Paul's Episcopal Church (Englewood, New Jersey)
 Grace St. Paul's Episcopal Church, Mercerville-Hamilton Square, New Jersey
 St. Paul's Episcopal Church (Brooklyn)
 St. Paul's Episcopal (Orleans, New York)
 St. Paul's Episcopal Church, now Calvary Baptist Church (Ossining, New York)
 St. Paul's Episcopal Church Complex (Patchogue, New York)
 St. Paul's Episcopal Church (Poughkeepsie, New York)
 St. Paul's Episcopal Church (Spring Valley, New York)
 St. Paul's Episcopal Church (Troy, New York)
 Saint Paul's Episcopal Church (Watertown, New York)
 St. Paul's Episcopal Church and Churchyard, Edenton, North Carolina
 Saint Paul's Episcopal Church (Morganton, North Carolina)
 St. Paul's Episcopal Church and Cemetery, Wilkesboro, North Carolina
 St. Paul's Episcopal Church (Rugby, North Dakota)
 St. Paul Episcopal Cathedral (Cincinnati), Ohio
 St. Paul's Episcopal Church (Cleveland, Ohio)
 St. Paul's Episcopal Church (Cleveland Heights, Ohio)
 Saint Paul's Episcopal Church (Columbus, Ohio)
 St. Paul's Episcopal Church of East Cleveland, Ohio
 St. Paul's Episcopal Church (Fremont, Ohio), NRHP-listed
 St. Paul's Episcopal Church (Hicksville, Ohio)
 St. Paul's Episcopal Church (Medina, Ohio), NRHP-listed
 St. Paul's Episcopal Church, South Bass Island, Ohio
 St. Paul's Episcopal Church (Elkins Park, Pennsylvania)
 St. Paul's Episcopal Church (Exton, Pennsylvania)
 St. Paul's Episcopal Church (Chattanooga, Tennessee)
 St. Paul's Episcopal Church (Franklin, Tennessee)
 St. Paul's Episcopal Church (Greenville, Texas)
 Saint Paul's Episcopal Church (Waxahachie, Texas)
 St. Paul's Episcopal Church (Royalton, Vermont)
 St. Paul's Episcopal Church (Alexandria, Virginia)
 St. Paul's Episcopal Church (Hanover, Virginia), NRHP-listed
 St. Paul's Episcopal Church (Haymarket, Virginia), NRHP-listed
 St. Paul's Episcopal Church (King George, Virginia), NRHP-listed
 Saint Paul's Episcopal Church (Norfolk, Virginia)
 St. Paul's Episcopal Church (Richmond, Virginia)
 St. Paul's Episcopal Church (Port Townsend, Washington)
 St. Paul's Episcopal Church (Beloit, Wisconsin), NRHP-listed
 St. Paul's Episcopal Church (Milwaukee, Wisconsin)
 St. Paul's Episcopal Church (Watertown, Wisconsin), NRHP-listed
 St. Paul's Episcopal Church (Evanston, Wyoming)

See also
 St. Paul's Church (disambiguation)
 St. Paul's Protestant Episcopal Church (disambiguation)